Cheryl Finley (born USA) is an art historian, author, curator and critic. She is a professor at Cornell University and Director of the AUC Art History + Curatorial Studies Collective. She won Bard Graduate Center's Horowitz Book Prize for her book, Committed to Memory: the Art of the Slave Ship Icon in 2019.

Early life and education
Finley studied Spanish at Wellesley as an undergraduate student and earned her PhD in Art History and African American studies from Yale University where she co-founded the Photographic Memory Workshop in 1998 with Laura Wexler, Leigh Raiford and Robin Bernstein.

Career 
Finley began in the art world as an art appraiser specializing in photography. She is currently Associate Professor and Director of Visual Studies, Cornell University. In 2016 Finley helped organize and host Black Portraitures III with Deborah Willis, Awam Amkpa and Manthia Diawara in Johannesburg. This nomadic annual conference convenes artists and scholars to discuss imagery of the African Diaspora in visual culture. In 2017 she was a speaker at the 28th Annual James Porter Colloquium at Howard University along with Lorna Simpson, Fred Wilson, Dawoud Bey, Kinsasha Holman Conwill, and Kellie Jones. That same year she spoke with Deborah Willis and Kellie Jones about Black social movements on a panel at the annual College Art Association's conference in New York. In 2019 Finley took a leave of absence from her teaching job at Cornell University to become the inaugural Director of the Atlanta University Center Collective for the Study of Art History and Curatorial Studies. The Collective culls together students from Clark Atlanta, Morehouse, and Spelman to study curatorial and art historical practices and is the only program in the US focused on training professionals of color in this field. In 2019 she was a panelist for Miami Art Basel's tenth annual Discussion on African Diaspora Art along with Dr. Moyo Okediji, and Sopo Aluko.

Finley writes primarily about Black contemporary artists. Among her publications is a monograph about the photographer Teenie Harris, Terry Adkins, a book about the use of the slave ship image in art and culture, a pictorial book about Harlem, and most recently an exhibition catalog from the collection of Souls Grown Deep Foundation. In 2019 Finley won the Horowitz Book Prize from the Bard Graduate Center for her book, Committed to Memory: The Art of the Slave Ship Icon. Finley has also contributed to ArtForum and ArtNEWS.

Bibliography 

 Finley, Cheryl (contributor), Kalia Brooks Nelson, Deborah Willis, Ellyn Toscano (editors). (2019) "Lois Mailou Jones in the World," Women and Migration Responses in Art and History. Open Book Publishers. .
Finley, Cheryl, Randall R. Griffey, Amelia Peck, Darryl Pinckney. (2018) My Soul Has Grown Deep: Black Art from the American South. Metropolitan Museum of Art. .
 Finley, Cheryl. (2018) Committed to Memory: the Art of the Slave Ship Icon Princeton University Press. .
 Finley, Cheryl, Ian Berry, Anthony Elms, Okwui Enwezor, Charles Gaines. (2017) Terry Adkins: Recital. Prestel. .
 Finley, Cheryl, Laurence A. Glasco, Joe W. Trotter. (2011) Teenie Harris, Photographer: Image, Memory, History. University of Pittsburgh Press. .
 Finley, Cheryl, Deborah Willis, Elizabeth Alexander, Thelma Golden. (2010) Harlem: A Century in Images. Skira Rizzoli. .
 Finley, Cheryl, Salah M. Hassan. (2008) Diaspora Memory Place: David Hammons, Maria Magdalena Campos-pons, Pamela Z. Prestel Pub. .
 Finley, Cheryl, Solange Oliviera Farkas, Zita Nunes, et al. (2005) Mostra Pan Africana de Arte Contemporanea / Pan-African Exhibition of Contemporary Art. Associacao Cultural Videobrasil. ASIN: B005MKQ67E.
Finley, Cheryl. (2002) James VanDerZee: Harlem Guaranteed. Michael Rosenfeld Gallery. ASIN: B00I9OL5I0.
Finley, Cheryl, Daniell Cornell. (2000) Imaging African art: Documentation and Transformation. Yale University Art Gallery. .
Finley, Cheryl, Nell Andrew, Adam Jolles, Ann Vollmann Bible, et al. (1999) Tracing Memory - Chicago Art Journal, Spring 1999. University of Chicago. ASIN: B00E7VKR2E.
Finley, Cheryl, William Barlow. (1994) From Swing to Soul: An Illustrated History of African American Popular Music from 1930 to 1960. Elliott & Clark Pub. .

References

External links 
 ArtForum on Soul of a Nation
 ArtNEWS on Deborah Willis

Living people
American art historians
Women art historians
American art critics
American women non-fiction writers
Wellesley College alumni
Yale University alumni
Cornell University faculty
Spelman College faculty
Year of birth missing (living people)
American women curators
American curators